Actor Paul Schneider initially made a name for himself as flawed, but relatable characters in several small films before moving into more mainstream fare on television. A friend and classmate of David Gordon Green while attending the North Carolina School for the Arts, it was a natural progression for Schneider to appear in the writer-director's first two feature films, "George Washington" (2000) and "All the Real Girls" (2003). The latter effort, in particular, gave the actor enough exposure to land work in projects like Cameron Crowe's dramedy "Elizabethtown" (2005) and "The Assassination of Jesse James by the Coward Robert Ford" (2007). More prominent performances in the dramas "Lars and the Real Girl" (2007) and "Bright Star" (2009) illustrated just how versatile Schneider was, causing people to take notice. So much so, that his regular cast role on the television comedy "Parks and Recreation" (NBC, 2009-15) was written out after just two seasons when further film offers lured the actor away. Subsequent screen efforts included a supporting turn in the Reese Witherspoon-Robert Pattinson period romance "Water for Elephants" (2011). By embracing the possibilities offered by both network television and independent film, Schneider ensured himself a healthy future in Hollywood. Some of his directorial credits include Baywatch, Beverly Hills, 90210, L.A. Law and JAG. He has also directed a number of television films, including You Lucky Dog and Can of Worms for Disney Channel.

External links

American film directors
American television directors
Living people
Place of birth missing (living people)
Year of birth missing (living people)